Hans Frühwirth is an Austrian retired slalom canoeist who competed in the late 1940s and the early 1950s. He won four medals at the ICF Canoe Slalom World Championships with a two golds (Folding K-1: 1951, Folding K-1 team: 1951) and two silvers (Folding K-1: 1949, Folding K-1 team: 1949).

References

Austrian male canoeists
Possibly living people
Year of birth missing (living people)
Medalists at the ICF Canoe Slalom World Championships